Jorge Dávalos Mercado (born 3 July 1957) is a Mexican football manager and former player.

References

External links
 

1957 births
Living people
Footballers from Jalisco
Association football midfielders
Mexico under-20 international footballers
Mexico international footballers
Leones Negros UdeG footballers
Liga MX players
Mexican football managers
C.D. Guadalajara managers
1991 CONCACAF Gold Cup players
People from Tala, Jalisco
Mexican footballers